The New Left Review is a British bimonthly journal covering world politics, economy, and culture, which was established in 1960.

History

Background 
As part of the British "New Left" a number of new journals emerged to carry commentary on matters of Marxist theory. One of these was The Reasoner, a magazine established by historians E. P. Thompson and John Saville in July 1956. A total of three quarterly issues was produced. This publication was expanded and further developed from 1957 to 1959 as The New Reasoner, with an additional ten issues being produced.

Another radical journal of the period was the Universities and Left Review, a publication established in 1957 with less of a sense of allegiance to the British communist tradition. This publication was more youth-oriented and pacifist in orientation, expressing opposition to the militaristic rhetoric of the Cold War, voicing strong opposition to the 1956 Suez War, and support for the emerging Campaign for Nuclear Disarmament.

Establishment 
New Left Review was established in January 1960 when The New Reasoner and Universities and Left Review merged their boards. The first editor-in-chief of the merged publication was Stuart Hall. The early publication's style, featuring illustrations on the cover and in the interior layout, was more irreverent and free-flowing than later issues of the publication, which tended to be of a more somber, academic bent. Hall was succeeded as editor in 1962 by Perry Anderson.

In 1993, nineteen of the members of the editorial committee resigned, citing a loss of control over content by the Editorial
Board/Committee in favour of a Shareholders' Trust, which they argued was undemocratic. The Trust cited financial sustainability of the journal as an issue. It comprised Perry Anderson, his brother Benedict Anderson, and Ronald Fraser. The Journal was again relaunched in 2000, and  Perry Anderson returned as editor until 2003.

Since 2008
New Left Review has followed the economic crisis as well as its global political repercussions. An essay by Wolfgang Streeck (issue 71) was called "the most powerful description of what has gone wrong in western societies" by the Financial Timess contributor Christopher Caldwell.

Abstracting and indexing 
In 2003, the magazine ranked 12th by impact factor on a list of the top 20 political science journals in the world. By 2018, however, the Journal Citation Reports ranked New Left Reviews impact factor at 1.967, ranking it 51st out of 176 journals in the category "Political Science". In 2021 the alternative index, Scopus, placed the journal as 99/556 Political Science and International Relations journals with a citation score of 2.4.

References

Further reading 
 Birchall, Ian, "New Left Review: The Search for Theory", International Socialism, Issue 115, 2 July 2007
 Blackledge, Paul (2004). Perry Anderson, Marxism and the New Left, Merlin Press.
 
 Collini, Stefan. "A Life in Politics: The New Left Review at 50", The Guardian, 13 February 2010.
 
 
 Saval, Nikil. [https://www.nplusonemag.com/issue-8/reviews/new-left-review-1962-present/ "New Left Review, 1962–Present
"], n+1, October 6, 2009.
 Thompson, Duncan (2007). Pessimism of the Intellect? A History of New Left Review, Merlin Press.

External links 
 
 The New Reasoner Archive of Contents, Amiel Melburn Trust Internet Archive
 Universities & Left Review Archive of Contents, Amiel Melburn Trust Internet Archive
 Text of the March 1993 resignation of the majority of the editorial committee.

Bi-monthly magazines published in the United Kingdom
Magazines published in London
1960 establishments in the United Kingdom
Magazines established in 1960
Political magazines published in the United Kingdom
Socialist magazines
New Left